Roșca is a Romanian surname which may refer to:

Alexandru Roșca, Romanian psychologist
Dumitru D. Roșca, Romanian philosopher
Iurie Roşca, Moldovan politician
Laurențiu Țigăeru Roșca, Romanian politician
Marcel Roşca, Romanian sport shooter
Mihai Roșca, Moldovan footballer

Romanian-language surnames